Ghostroads – A Japanese Rock N Roll Ghost Story is a 2017 Japanese rock n roll comedy film conceived and produced by Mike "in Tokyo" Rogers and written by Rogers and James Honeycutt. It was directed by Enrico Ciccu and co-produced and edited by Ken Nishikawa. It stars Japanese Rock musicians Mr. Pan of The Neatbeats, Tatsuji Nobuhara of the Privates, Danny of the 50 Kaitenz, Darrell Harris, Los Angeles cultural icon and radio DJ Rodney Bingenheimer, and American filmmaker Kansas Bowling.

Ghostroads – A Japanese Rock N Roll Ghost Story received widespread acclaim, and enjoyed its World Premiere at the 25th Annual Raindance Film Festival in London in 2017. It also enjoyed nationwide theatrical release in Japan through King Records.

References

External links 
 
 Ghostroads: A Japanese Rock N Roll Ghost Story (2017) – Internet Movie Database Movie Information Page
 Ghostroads – Exquisite terror reviews Ghostroads – Ghostroads – A Japanese Rock n Roll Ghost Story Exquisite terror review from 2017
 Japan's Rock Bands Come Together for Ghostroads – A Japanese Rock n Roll Ghost Story Movie – Dread Central review from 2017
 ETC Ghostroads review – Battle Royale With Cheese review from 2017
 Ghostroads: A Japanese Rock 'n' Roll Ghost Story – Tony's Folio review from 2017
 GHOSTROADS: A JAPANESE ROCK N' ROLL STORY – Starburst magazine review from 2017
 25th Raindance Film Festival World Premiere: Ghostroads – A Japanese Rock n Roll Ghost Story – With Guitars Magazine news announcement from 2017
 GHOSTROADS: A JAPANESE ROCK N' ROLL STORY – Starburst magazine review from 2017
 Raindance Film Festival World Premiere: Ghostroads – A Japanese Rock n Roll Ghost Story – Dirty Waters Records press release from 2017
 Japan's Rock Bands Come Together – Internet Movie Database article 2017

Japanese comedy films
2010s Japanese-language films
Films shot in Tokyo
2010s Japanese films